Ahmad Khesraw (born February 6, 1982) is an Afghan footballer. He plays for the Afghanistan national team.

National team statistics

External links

1982 births
Living people
Afghan footballers
Association football midfielders
Afghanistan international footballers